Donald Paul Wood (March 22, 1933 – July 7, 2015) was a Canadian politician and a businessman and farmer. He was elected to the House of Commons of Canada as a Member of the Liberal Party in a 1977 by-election, after the resignation of Tory Angus MacLean on October 20, 1976. During this time, he was Parliamentary Secretary to the Minister of Regional Economic Expansion. He lost the 1979 election to Melbourne Gass. He lost the 1968 election to the Hon. Angus MacLean. He also sat as a member of various standing committees including Agriculture, Fisheries and Forestry and Public Accounts. Wood died on July 7, 2015.

He was honoured along with other members who passed in 2015 in a memorial ceremony held in the Senate Chambers on May 30, 2016 hosted by The Canadian Association of Former Parliamentarians.

Electoral record

References

External links 
 

1933 births
2015 deaths
People from Charlottetown
Liberal Party of Canada MPs
Members of the House of Commons of Canada from Prince Edward Island